Samantha Harding (born May 31, 1994) is a Canadian long-distance swimmer from Brandon, Manitoba. She won a silver medal in the 10 km event at the 2015 FINA World Cup Cozumel, Mexico. She finished 7th at the 2015 Pan American Games.

References

External links
Swimming Canada bios

1994 births
Canadian female long-distance swimmers
Canadian female swimmers
Living people
Sportspeople from Brandon, Manitoba
Swimmers at the 2015 Pan American Games
Pan American Games competitors for Canada
20th-century Canadian women
21st-century Canadian women